Ambia pedionoma is a moth in the family Crambidae. It is found in the Philippines (Palawan).

The wingspan is about 15 mm. The forewings are white, all fasciae consisting of chamois bands edged with fuscous. The subbasal and antemedial fasciae are wavy and the postmedial fascia is slightly incurved from the costa to vein 2 with a point on the proximal edge at vein 7, acutely angled at vein 2, then arched and inwardly oblique to the inner margin at one third, from the top of the arched portion there is a band, rising to the subcosta, bent and arched toward the base and terminating on the median nervure. The subterminal fascia is slightly waved to vein 2 where it is constricted, then inwardly oblique to the inner margin at one half. The terminal band is chamois edged with fuscous-black. The hindwings are concolorons with the forewings, the postmedial fascia forming on the forewings is continuations of the postmedial and subterminal fasciae which join on the median nervure and continue as a single band to the inner margin. The subterminal fascia is waved and the terminal band as on the forewing.

References

Moths described in 1931
Musotiminae
Moths of Asia